Iowa is a state located in the Midwestern United States. As of 2010, there are 947 incorporated cities in the U.S. state of Iowa.

Iowa is divided into 99 counties and has 947 cities. Every incorporated place in Iowa is called a "city", regardless of population. Incorporated cities can choose one of six forms of municipal government that differ primarily on how the legislative and administrative responsibilities are separated: mayor-council, mayor-council with an appointed manager, council-manager-at-large, commission, council-manager-ward, home rule charter or special charter. Most operate as mayor–council. 490 of Iowa's 947 cities—slightly more than half—have fewer than 500 residents.

According to the 2010 Census, 1,950,256 of Iowa's 3,046,355 residents lived in urban areas, accounting for 64.0% of the population. The first city to incorporate was Farmington on January 11, 1841, while the most recent was Maharishi Vedic City on July 25, 2001. The smallest cities by population are Beaconsfield and Le Roy, each with 15 residents.



Cities

Former city

See also

Iowa census statistical areas
List of largest Iowa cities by population
List of counties in Iowa
List of unincorporated communities in Iowa
List of townships in Iowa

Notes

References

Iowa
Cities